Mount Munson is a mountain (2,800 m) rising from the northwest flank of Mount Wade, 3 nautical miles (6 km) from its summit, in the Prince Olav Mountains. Discovered and photographed by R. Admiral Byrd on flights to the Queen Maud Mountains in November 1929. Named by Advisory Committee on Antarctic Names (US-ACAN) for Captain William H. Munson, U.S. Navy, Commanding Officer of U.S. Navy Air Development Squadron Six, otherwise known as VX-6, 1959–61.

Mountains of the Ross Dependency
Dufek Coast